Alty Karliev (January 6, 1909 – December 11, 1973) was a Soviet and Turkmen stage and film actor, director and dramatist. He studied at the Turkmen Drama Studio and the Baku Theatre College, graduating from the latter in 1931. After this, he worked as an actor at the Ashkhabad Drama Theatre.

Karliev's first film appearance was as Kelkhan in the 1939 film Soviet Patriots. Other notable film roles included Nury in Dursun (1940) and Aldar Kose in The Magic Crystal (1945). His appearance in The Magic Crystal gained him a following across the Soviet Union.

Karliev did not have any formal training as a director, but learned from Russian and Ukrainian directors. His first directing credit was in 1957, when he worked with Yevgeni Ivanov-Barkov on the first color film produced by Turkmenfilm, Extraordinary Mission. His next film was Ayna (1960). This was followed by The Decisive Step (1965). His portrait was painted by Ivan Cherinko.

Awards and honors 

 Two Stalin Prizes, 2nd class (1941, 1949)
 Jubilee Medal "In Commemoration of the 100th Anniversary of the Birth of Vladimir Ilyich Lenin"
 Medal "For Valiant Labour in the Great Patriotic War 1941–1945"
 Order of Lenin
 Order of the Red Banner of Labour
 People's Artist of the USSR (1955)

References

1909 births
1973 deaths
20th-century Turkmenistan male actors
People from Transcaspian Oblast
Azerbaijan State University of Culture and Arts alumni
Communist Party of the Soviet Union members
People's Artists of the USSR
Stalin Prize winners
Recipients of the Order of Lenin
Recipients of the Order of the Red Banner of Labour
Soviet dramatists and playwrights
Soviet film directors
Soviet male film actors
Soviet male stage actors
Soviet opera directors
Soviet screenwriters
Soviet theatre directors
Turkmenistan film directors
Turkmenistan male film actors
Turkmenistan screenwriters
Turkmenistan stage actors